Olga Mikhailovna Stjazhkina (born 7 June 1970), née Florov, is a Russian chess player who received the FIDE title of Woman Grandmaster (WGM) in 1994.

Biography
Olga Stjazhkina is Saint Petersburg chess school graduate. She five times won Saint Petersburg City Women's Chess Championship. Olga Stjazhkina twice won Russian Women's Team Chess Championships.

In 2000, Olga Stjazhkina participated in Women's World Chess Championship by knock-out system and in the first round lost to Wang Lei.

In 1994, she received the FIDE Woman Grandmaster (WGM) title. In 2015, she became a FIDE Arbiter (FA).

Her daughter Anna (born 1997) also is chess master, winner of World Youth Chess Championships and European Youth Chess Championships.

References

External links
 
 
 

1970 births
Living people
Russian female chess players
Chess woman grandmasters